Al Ahly SC is an Egyptian professional football club based in Cairo. The club first participated in an African competition in 1976. The first international cup they took part in was the African Cup of Champions Clubs where they lost 3–1 on aggregate to Algerian club MC Alger.

Al Ahly won four African Cup Winners' Cup, the most of any team during the competition between 1975 and 2004. They also have won the CAF Champions League nine times which is also the most of any team which included a back to back titles in 2005/2006 and 2012/2013. The club has also participated in six FIFA Club World Cups with their best performance being third place at the 2006 and 2020 edition.

African football
PR = Preliminary round
FR = First round
SR = Second round
PO = Play-off round
QF = Quarter-final
SF = Semi-final

Notes

Arabian football
PR = Preliminary round
FR = First round
SR = Second round
PO = Play-off round
QF = Quarter-final
SF = Semi-final

Notes

Other competitions

CAF Super Cup

FIFA Club World Cup

Afro-Asian Club Championship

Statistics

By season
Information correct as of 30 May 2022.
Key

Pld = Played
W = Games won
D = Games drawn
L = Games lost
F = Goals for
A = Goals against
Grp = Group stage
PR = Preliminary round
R1 = First round
R2 = Second round
PR = Play-off round
R16 = Round of 16
QF = Quarter-final
SF = Semi-final

Overall record
:

Notes

References

External links
 

Al Ahly SC
Al Ahly